Vellore division is a revenue division in the Vellore district of Tamil Nadu, India. It comprises the taluks of 
1.Katpadi  
2.Vellore and 
3.Anaicut and
4.Gudiyattam, 
5.Peranambattu.

References 

 

Vellore district